Jeanne Bécu, Comtesse du Barry (19 August 1743 – 8 December 1793) was the last maîtresse-en-titre of King Louis XV of France. She was executed by guillotine during the French Revolution due to accounts of treason—particularly being suspected of assisting émigrés flee from the Revolution.

In order for the king to take Jeanne as a maîtresse-en-titre, she had to be married to someone of high rank so that she could be allowed at court, so she was hastily married on 1 September 1768 to Comte Guillaume du Barry. The marriage ceremony was accompanied by a false birth certificate, created by Jean-Baptiste du Barry. The certificate made Jeanne appear younger by three years and obscured her poor background. Henceforth, she was deemed as official maîtresse-en-titre to the king.

Her arrival at the French royal court was considered scandalous by some, as she had been a prostitute as well as being a commoner. For these reasons, she was disliked by many, including Marie Antoinette. Marie Antoinette's dislike of Jeanne and refusal to speak to her was seen as a major issue within the royal court and had to be resolved. On New Year's Day 1772, Marie Antoinette remarked to Jeanne, "There are many people at Versailles today". This interaction pleased both Jeanne and the royal court, and the dispute ended, though many at court still disapproved of Jeanne thereafter.

During the Reign of Terror during the French Revolution, Jeanne was imprisoned due to accounts of treason, the claims being made by her page Zamor. Soon after her imprisonment, she was executed by guillotine on 8 December 1793. Her body was buried in the Madeleine cemetery. The gems which she had smuggled out of France during the Revolution were found due to her confession, and were sold at auction in 1795.

Early years

Jeanne Bécu was the illegitimate daughter of Anne Bécu, a 30-year-old seamstress. Jeanne's father remains unidentified; however, it is possible that her father was Jean Jacques Gomard, a friar known as frère Ange. One of her mother's acquaintances, and presumed brief lover, Monsieur Billiard-Dumonceaux, took 3-year-old Jeanne and her mother into his care when they traveled from Vaucouleurs to Paris. There, Anne was placed by Billiard-Dumonceaux as a cook in his own mistress's household. Jeanne was well-liked by the mistress, Francesca, who pampered Jeanne. Jeanne's education began at a convent, named Couvent de Saint Aurea.

At the age of fifteen, Jeanne left the Couvent, for she was regarded as having come of age. Around that time, Jeanne and her mother were evicted from Monsieur Dumonceaux's household, and were sent to live at the small household of Anne's husband, Nicolas Rançon. What caused the eviction is unknown.

Jeanne needed to find some sort of income, and at first was in the streets of Paris carrying a box full of trinkets for sale. Over time she worked at different occupations: she was first offered a post as an assistant to a young hairdresser named Lametz. Jeanne had a brief relationship with him which may have produced a daughter, although it is highly improbable. Jeanne was soon employed as a dame de compagnie (companion) to an elderly widow, Madame de la Garde, but was sent away when her presence began to affect the marital affairs of both Madame de la Garde's two sons. Later, Jeanne worked as a milliners assistant as a grisette in a haberdashery shop named 'À la Toilette', which was owned by a Madame Labille and run by her husband. Labille's daughter, Adélaïde Labille-Guiard, became a good friend of Jeanne.

As reflected in paintings from the time, Jeanne was a remarkably attractive blonde woman with hair in thick golden ringlets and almond-shaped blue eyes. Her beauty came to the attention of Jean-Baptiste du Barry, whose brother, Comte Guillaume du Barry, owned a casino. Jeanne met du Barry in 1763, when she was entertaining in Madame Quisnoy's brothel-casino. Guillaume du Barry installed her in his household and made her his mistress. Giving her the appellation of Mademoiselle Lange, Guillaume helped establish Jeanne's career as a courtesan in the highest circles of Parisian society; this enabled her to take several aristocratic men as brief lovers or clients.

Mistress of Louis XV: 1768–1774

Jeanne quickly became a sensation in Paris, building up a large aristocratic clientele. She had many lovers; from Louis XV of France's ministers to his own courtiers, the most prominent being Maréchal de Richelieu. Due to this, Jean-Baptiste du Barry saw her as holding influence over Louis XV, who became aware of her in 1768 while she was visiting Versailles. The errand involved the Duc de Choiseul, who found her rather ordinary, in contrast to what most men thought of her. The king took a great interest in her and found out her identity with the help of his personal valet and procurer Dominique Guillaume Lebel. Jeanne was escorted to the royal boudoir frequently, and it was soon becoming a concern for Lebel when the liaison was seemingly becoming more than casual. In any case, Jeanne could not qualify as a maîtresse-en-titre unless she had a title; however, after the king was told that Jeanne was a prostitute, the king ordered that Jeanne be married to a man of good lineage so she might be brought to court. This was solved by her marriage on 1 September 1768 to Jean-Baptiste du Barry's brother, Comte Guillaume du Barry. The marriage ceremony included a false birth certificate created by Jean-Baptiste du Barry himself, making Jeanne appear younger by three years and of fictitious noble descent.

Jeanne was installed above the king's quarters in Lebel's former rooms. She lived a lonely life, unable to be seen with the king since no formal presentation had taken place. Very few, if any, of the nobility at court deigned to become acquainted with her, for none could accept the fact that a woman of the street had the audacity to converse and intermingle with those above her station. Comte du Barry constantly pestered Jeanne and urged her to speak of presentation with the king. Louis XV, in return, asked her to find a proper sponsor to present her. Richelieu took responsibility for achieving this, and after a few women were approached, and asked too high a price to take on the role, a sponsor, Madame de Béarn, was found after having her huge gambling debts paid off.

On the first occasion when the presentation was to take place, Madame de Béarn was panicked by fear and feigned a sprained ankle. On the second occasion, the king was badly hurt when he fell off his horse during a hunt and broke his arm. Finally, Jeanne was presented to the court on 22 April 1769, an occasion which was long-awaited by the gathering crowds outside the palace gates, and by the gossiping courtiers within the Hall of Mirrors. Jeanne was described as wearing a silvery white gown brocaded with gold—the gown was bedecked in jewels sent by the king the night before, and had huge panniers at the sides. The dress had been specifically ordered by Richelieu for Jeanne; many courtiers claimed that it had never been seen before. Her coiffure was also noticeably spectacular, being the cause of her late arrival.

Jeanne first befriended Claire Françoise, who was brought from Languedoc by her brother Jean-Baptiste du Barry to accompany her, being also a "tutor" to help Jeanne let go of her past and acquire a courtly demeanour. Later on, she also befriended the Maréchale de Mirepoix.  Other women of nobility were bribed into forming her entourage.

Jeanne quickly accustomed herself to living in luxury. Louis XV had also given her a young Bengali slave named Zamor, whom she dressed in elegant clothing to show him off. Jeanne developed a liking for Zamor and began to educate him.

According to Stanley Loomis' biography Du Barry, Jeanne's everyday routine began at 9.a.m, when Zamor would bring her a morning cup of chocolate. She would then be dressed in a fine gown of her choice and put on her jewellery. Either hairdresser Nokelle (for special occasions) or Berline (for everyday styles) would come to do her hair in powders and curls. She would then receive friends, dressmakers, jewellers and artists showing off their new stock, hoping she would be interested in buying something of their offers. She was extravagant, but her good nature was not spoiled. When the old Comte and Comtesse de Lousene were forcibly evicted from their château due to heavy debts, they were sentenced to beheading because the comtesse had shot dead a bailiff and a police officer while resisting. To their great fortune, they were good friends with Madame de Béarn, who told Jeanne of their situation. Though warned by Richelieu of her possible failure, she asked the king to pardon them, refusing to rise from her kneeling posture if he did not accept her request. Louis XV was astounded and his heart thawed, to which he said, "Madame, I am delighted that the first favour you should ask of me should be an act of mercy!" A similar thing happened when Jeanne was visited by a certain Monsieur Mandeville, who asked pardon in the name of a young girl condemned to the gallows: she had been convicted of infanticide for giving birth to a stillborn child and not informing the authorities. Jeanne wrote a letter to the Chancellor of France, who granted the pardon.

Jeanne was a tremendous triumph at court. She wore extravagant gowns of great proportions both in creation and cost, exhausting the treasury all the more. With diamonds covering her neck and ears, she was now the king's maîtresse déclarée. Due to her new position at court, she made both friends and enemies. Her most bitter rival was the Duchesse de Gramont, who had in vain tried her best to acquire the place of the late Marquise de Pompadour, although according to Diane Adélaïde de Mailly, Béatrix de Gramont would have disdained the comtesse no matter what. She had, since the beginning, plotted with her brother for the removal of Jeanne, even going to the extent of slandering her name as well as the king's, in pamphlets.

In time Jeanne became acquainted with the Duc d’Aiguillon, who sided with her against the Duc de Choiseul. As Jeanne's power in court grew stronger, Choiseul began feeling his was waning, and against the king's wishes after the Seven Years' War, he decided that France was capable of war again, and sided with the Spanish against the British for possession of the Falkland Islands. When this plot came to light, du Barry exposed it to the king and, on Christmas Eve 1771, Choiseul was dismissed from his ministerial role and from court. He then went into exile at his Chanteloup property, alongside his wife and sister.

While Jeanne was part of the faction that brought down the Duc de Choiseul, she was unlike her late predecessor, Madame de Pompadour, in that she had little interest in politics, preferring rather to pass her time ordering new gowns and jewellery. However, the king went so far as to let her participate in state councils. A note in a modern edition of the Souvenirs of Mme. Campan recalls an anecdote: the king said to the Duc de Noailles that, with Madame du Barry, he had discovered new pleasures; "Sire" – answered the duke – "that's because your Majesty has never been in a brothel." While Jeanne was known for her good nature and support of artists, she grew increasingly unpopular because of the king's financial extravagance towards her. She was forever in debt despite her huge monthly income from the king—at one point she was given three hundred thousand livres.

She remained in her position until the death of Louis XV, and the attempt to depose her made by the Duc de Choiseul and the Duc de Aiguillon, by trying to arrange a secret marriage between the king and Madame Pater proved unsuccessful.

Diamond necklace affair

In 1772, the infatuated Louis XV requested that Parisian jewellers Boehmer and Bassenge create an elaborate and spectacular jeweled necklace for Jeanne—one that would surpass all known others in extravagance—at an estimated cost of two million livres. The necklace, still not completed nor paid for when Louis XV died, would eventually trigger a scandal involving Jeanne de la Motte-Valois, in which Queen Marie Antoinette would be accused of bribing the Cardinal de Rohan to purchase it for her, accusations which would figure prominently in the onset of the French Revolution.

Exile: 1774–1792
In time, King Louis XV started to think of death and repentance, and began missing appointments in Jeanne's boudoir. During a stay at the Petit Trianon with her, Louis felt the first symptoms of smallpox. He was brought back to the palace at night and put to bed, where his daughters and Jeanne stayed beside him. On 4 May 1774, the king suggested to Madame du Barry that she leave Versailles, both to protect her from infection and so that he could prepare for confession and the last rites. She was relieved of her duties by Doctor Lemonnier and immediately retired to the Duc d'Aiguillon's estate near Rueil. Following the death of the and his grandson's ascension to the throne as Louis XVI, Marie Antoinette had Jeanne exiled to the Abbey du Pont-aux-Dames near Meaux-en-Brie. At first she was not met warmly by the nuns, who knew that in their midst they had the 31-year-old former royal mistress, but soon enough they grew accustomed to her timid ways and opened up to her, most of all the abbess Madame de la Roche-Fontenelle.

After a year at the convent, Jeanne was granted permission to visit the surrounding countryside on one condition: that she return by sundown. A month later, she was given permission to leave the abbey but not to venture closer than ten miles from Versailles, thus cancelling her idea of going to her beloved Château de Louveciennes. She then managed to purchase property belonging to the family of the wife of Madame de la Garde's younger son, whom she knew from her earlier years. Two years later, she moved to the Louveciennes.

In the following years, she had a liaison with Louis Hercule Timoléon de Cossé-Brissac. She later also fell in love with Henry Seymour of Redland, whom she met when he moved with his family to the neighborhood of the Château. In time, Seymour became fed up with his secret love affair and sent a painting to Jeanne with the words 'leave me alone' written in English at the bottom, which the painter Lemoyne copied in 1796. The Duc de Brissac proved the more faithful in this ménage-a-trois, having kept Jeanne in his heart even though he knew of her affair with Seymour.

During the French Revolution, Brissac was captured while visiting Paris, and was slaughtered by a mob. Late one night, Jeanne heard the sound of a small drunken crowd approaching the Château, and into the opened window where she looked out someone threw a blood-stained cloth. To Jeanne's horror, it contained Brissac's head, at which sight she fainted.

Imprisonment, trial and execution: 1792–93

Jeanne's Bengali slave Zamor, along with another member of du Barry's domestic staff, had joined the Jacobin club. He became a follower of the revolutionary George Grieve and then an office-bearer in the Committee of Public Safety. Jeanne found out about this in 1792 and questioned Zamor about his connections with Grieve. Upon realising the depth of his involvement, she gave him three days' notice to quit her service. This Zamor did without hesitation, and promptly proceeded to denounce his mistress to the committee.

Based largely on Zamor's testimony, Madame du Barry was suspected of financially assisting émigrés who had fled the French Revolution. Madame du Barry was finally arrested in 1793. When the Revolutionary Tribunal of Paris accused her of treason and condemned her to death, she vainly attempted to save herself by revealing the location of the gemstones she had hidden. During the ensuing trial, Zamor gave Chittagong as his birthplace; he was probably of Siddi origin.

On 8 December 1793, Madame du Barry was beheaded by the guillotine on the Place de la Révolution. On the way to the guillotine, she collapsed in the tumbrel and cried, "You are going to hurt me! Why?!" Terrified, she screamed for mercy and begged the watching crowd for help. Her last words to the executioner are said to have been: «De grâce, monsieur le bourreau, encore un petit moment!» – "One more moment, Mr. Executioner, I beg you!" She was buried in the Madeleine Cemetery, like many others executed during the Reign of Terror, including Louis XVI and Marie Antoinette.

Although her French estate went to the Tribunal de Paris, the jewels she had smuggled out of France to England were sold at an auction at Christie's in London, in 1795. Colonel Johann Keglevich, a brother of Major General Stephan Bernhard Keglevich, took part in the Battle of Mainz in 1795 with Hessian mercenaries, who were financed by the British with the money from this sale.

Relationship with Marie Antoinette
Jeanne's relationship with Marie Antoinette was contentious. The first meeting of the two was during a family supper at the Château of La Muette, on 15 May 1770—the day before Marie Antoinette's wedding with the Dauphin Louis-Auguste. Jeanne had only been the king's mistress for little over a year, and many thought she would not be included in the list of guests for the occasion. It ended up being otherwise, to the disgust of most of those present. Marie Antoinette noticed Jeanne, who stood out from the rest of the crowd with her extravagant appearance and a high talkative voice. The comtesse de Noailles informed Marie Antoinette that the role of Jeanne was to give pleasure to the king, and the 14-year-old archduchess innocently said that she would be her rival in such role. The Comte de Provence soon after divulged the true, sexual, nature of such pleasure, causing instant hatred in Marie Antoinette towards Madame du Barry for such immorality. This rivalry continued, especially since the Dauphine supported Choiseul as the proponent of the alliance with Austria. Marie Antoinette defied court protocol by refusing to speak to Madame du Barry, owing not only to her disapproval of the latter's background, but also after hearing from the Comte de Provence of du Barry's amused reaction to a story told by the Cardinal de Rohan during one of her dinner parties, in which Marie Antoinette's mother, Empress Maria Theresa, was slandered.

Jeanne furiously complained to the king, who then complained to the Austrian ambassador Mercy, who in turn did his best to convince Marie Antoinette to change her ways. Eventually, during a ball on New Year's Day 1772, Marie Antoinette spoke indirectly to Jeanne by casually observing; "There are many people at Versailles today", giving her the option to respond or not.

In popular culture

Food

Many dishes, such as Soup du Barry, are named after Jeanne. All dishes "du Barry" have a creamy white sauce, and many have cauliflower in them. The cauliflower may be an allusion to her powdered wigs, which had curls piled high on top of each other like cauliflower florets.

Film

Madame du Barry was portrayed in film by:
 Mrs. Leslie Carter in the 1915 film DuBarry, directed by Edoardo Bencivenga
 Theda Bara in the 1917 film Madame Du Barry, directed by J. Gordon Edwards
 Pola Negri in the 1919 film Madame DuBarry, directed by Ernst Lubitsch
 Norma Talmadge in the 1930 film Du Barry, Woman of Passion
 Dolores del Río in the 1934 film Madame Du Barry, directed by William Dieterle
 Gladys George in the 1938 MGM film Marie Antoinette, which starred Norma Shearer in the title role
 Lucille Ball in the 1943 movie version of DuBarry Was a Lady
 Margot Grahame in the 1949 film Black Magic; it also starred Orson Welles in the lead role of Count Cagliostro
 Martine Carol in the 1954 film Madame du Barry, directed by Christian-Jaque
 Asia Argento in the 2006 film Marie Antoinette, directed by Sofia Coppola
 Maïwenn in the 2023 film La Favorite; also starring Johnny Depp as Louis XV, directed by Maïwenn

Literature
In The Idiot, by Fyodor Dostoyevsky, the character Lebedev tells the story of Antoinette's life and execution and prays for her soul, among other souls.
Du Barry is one of the central characters in Sally Christie's The Enemies of Versailles (2017).

Television

 Du Barry is portrayed by French actress Gaia Weiss in the BBC/CANAL+ 8 part, television series: "Marie Antoinette".  Her relationship with Marie Antoinette is a core theme of the first four episodes, at the end of which Antoinette (now queen) persuades her husband, Louis XVI, to have her exiled upon his accession to the throne after the death of his grandfather, Louis XV, who had intended to marry Du Barry but died before that could take place.
 Du Barry was also portrayed by Japanese voice actress Ryoko Kinomiya in the anime The Rose of Versailles, as a villainous, scheming enemy of Marie Antoinette; her struggles with the young princess are a major concern of the story in its early stages.

Opera
Gräfin Dubarry is an operetta in three acts by Carl Millöcker to a German libretto by F. Zell and Richard Genée.
La Du Barry is an opera (1912) in three acts by Giannino Antona Traversi and Ernrico Golisciani, with music by Ezio Camussi.

References
Citations

Bibliography

 
 
 
 
 
 
 
 
 
  translated from the French Madame du Barry, published by Tallandier, Paris, 1909.

External links

 Madame du Barry at Château de Versailles
 Full text of Memoirs of the Comtesse Du Barry from Project Gutenberg
 Catherine Delors: Madame du Barry returns to Versailles
 Jeanne Bécu, Countess du Barry at Unofficial Royalty

1743 births
1793 deaths
People from Vaucouleurs
Mistresses of Louis XV
Madame
Courtesans from Paris
French people executed by guillotine during the French Revolution
French nobility
French countesses
French socialites
Executed French women
People from Lorraine (duchy)
Jewellery collectors
18th-century French people
18th-century French women
French royal favourites